Kim Min-seo (born 1984) is a South Korean actress.

Kim Min-seo  may also refer to:

Kim Min-seo (badminton) (born 1985 as Kim Mi-young), South Korean female badminton player
Kim Min-seo (born 1996) better known by stage name Minseo, South Korean singer
Kim Min-seo (born 1997) better known by stage name , South Korean singer
Kim Min-seo (actress, born 2009), South Korean child actress

See also
Kim (Korean surname)
Min-seo, a Korean feminine given name